Headphone Injuries is the third EP by Australian rock band Sick Puppies. This EP was released digitally on 20 June 2006.

The EP was originally planned to be released on CD within a month or two of its digital debut, however, due to the success of the Free Hugs music video for "All the Same", the band opted to put out the Sick Puppies EP instead, which contains the same songs as Headphone Injuries with the addition of "All the Same". It is the first release to feature Mark Goodwin on drums.

Track listing
"My World" – 3:58
"Pitiful" – 3:44
"Asshole Father" – 2:59
"Deliverance" – 3:11

Personnel 
Sick Puppies
 Shim Moore – lead vocals, lead guitar
 Emma Anzai – bass, backing vocals
 Mark Goodwin – drums

Production
 Tim James – producer, mixing
 Antonina Armato – producer
 Paul Palmer – A&R, mixing
 Dorian Crozier – engineer
 Nigel Lundemo – engineer, assistant
 Paul Stepanek – management

References

2006 EPs
Sick Puppies albums